Gerald Michael Feierstein (born 1951) was the United States Ambassador to Yemen under President Barack Obama from September 2010 to October 2013. Since December 2013, Feierstein has served as Principal Deputy Assistant Secretary of State for Near East Affairs in the Department of State.

Background 
Feierstein was born in 1951 in Philadelphia, Pennsylvania.

He received a B.A. in Philosophy from Point Park College in 1973 and an M.A. in International Relations from Duquesne University in 1975.

In June 1975, he joined the Foreign Service.

Career

Diplomatic service 

In June 1975, Feierstein joined the Foreign Service as Director of the Office of Regional Affairs in the Near East Bureau. He subsequently served as: Director of the Office of Pakistan, Afghanistan, and Bangladesh Affairs; Deputy Director in the Office of Arabian Peninsula Affairs; and Desk Officer for Nepal, Pakistan and Egypt.

Between 2006 and 2008, Feierstein served in Washington, D.C. as Principal Deputy Assistant Coordinator and Deputy Assistant Coordinator for Programs in the Office of the Coordinator for Counterterrorism.

Feierstein has served at the following overseas posts:

In 2012, al Qaeda in Yemen offered  of gold (about US$160,000) for killing Ambassador Feierstein, and 5 million Yemeni riyals (about US$23,000) for killing an American soldier in Yemen.

Later

Since October 2016 , Feierstein has served as a Senior Fellow and Director for Gulf Affairs and Government Relations at the Middle East Institute.

In November 2018, the MEI Board of Directors named Feierstein as Senior Vice President of the Institute.

Personal life

Feierstein met his first wife, Mary, who is Pakistani, while first posted in Islamabad. His son served two combat tours in the United States Marine Corps during the Iraq War. In 2015, the marriage ended in divorce.  In 2015, Feierstein married Carolyn McIntyre.

References

External links

1951 births
Living people
Duquesne University alumni
Ambassadors of the United States to Yemen
Point Park University alumni
People from Philadelphia
American expatriates in Pakistan
United States Foreign Service personnel